Egg Harbor may refer to the following places in the United States of America:

New Jersey
Egg Harbor City, New Jersey
Egg Harbor Township, New Jersey
Great Egg Harbor River
Mullica River, formerly known as Little Egg Harbor River
Little Egg Harbor Township, New Jersey
Wisconsin
Egg Harbor, Wisconsin
Egg Harbor (town), Wisconsin

See also